A Rich Man's Darling is a 1918 American silent comedy drama film directed by Edgar Jones and starring Louise Lovely, Edna Maison and Philo McCullough.

Cast
 Louise Lovely as 	Julie Le Fabrier
 Edna Maison as Madame Ricardo
 Philo McCullough as Lee Brooks
 Harry Mann as Enrico Ricardo
 Harry Holden as Mason Brooks

References

Bibliography
 Rainey, Buck. Sweethearts of the Sage: Biographies and Filmographies of 258 actresses appearing in Western movies. McFarland & Company, 1992.

External links
 

1918 films
1918 drama films
1910s English-language films
American silent feature films
American black-and-white films
Universal Pictures films
Films directed by Edgar Jones
1910s American films
Silent American drama films